Tomáš Dujsík (born November 3, 1992) is a Czech professional ice hockey defenceman. He currently plays with HC Olomouc in the Czech Extraliga.

Dujsík made his Czech Extraliga debut playing with HC Kometa Brno debut during the 2012–13 Czech Extraliga season.

References

External links

1992 births
Living people
Czech ice hockey defencemen
AZ Havířov players
HC Kometa Brno players
HC ZUBR Přerov players
SK Horácká Slavia Třebíč players
Ice hockey people from Brno
HC Karlovy Vary players
HC Olomouc players